Raystede is an animal rescue and sanctuary based in Lewes, East Sussex. They provide rescue, rehabilitation, rehoming and sanctuary to both pets and farm animals.

History

Founded by Miss M Raymonde-Hawkins, Raystede began life as a rescue and sanctuary in 1952 in her cottage and back garden. The rescue now covers 43 acres and cares for over 2,000 animals a year and includes a shop and café.

The centre was forced to temporarily close to the general public in 2020 due to the COVID-19 pandemic.

Raystede on TV 
In 2019, Channel 4 filmed "Animal Rescue Live" on site at the sanctuary for a week-long series. The show was hosted by Professor Noel Fitzpatrick, Kate Quilton and Steve Jones.

References

External links 
Raystede.org

Animal charities based in the United Kingdom
Animal welfare organisations based in the United Kingdom
Animal sanctuaries